Sigmund Theophil Staden (6 November 1607 – 30 July 1655) was an important early German composer.

Staden was born in Kulmbach in the Principality of Bayreuth, son of Johann Staden, the founder of the so-called Nuremberg school. Based in Nuremberg, he was the composer of Seelewig (1644), the first German Singspiel. The only other works of his that survive are three Friedens-Gesänge from 1651.

Recordings
 Seelewig (1644) CPO
 Friedens-Seufftzer und Jubel-Geschrey - Musik für Den Westfälischen Frieden. Manfred Cordes. CPO 999 571-2 (1997)

References

1607 births
1655 deaths
German Baroque composers
German opera composers
Male opera composers
Pupils of Johann Staden
17th-century classical composers
German male classical composers
17th-century male musicians